Qaleh Shir (also Romanized as Qal‘eh Shīr, Qal‘eh-ye Shīr, and Qal‘eh-i-Shīr; also known as Qal‘a-i-Shīr) is a village in Karizan Rural District, Nasrabad District, Torbat-e Jam County, Razavi Khorasan Province, Iran. At the 2006 census, its population was 1,427, in 342 families.

References 

Populated places in Torbat-e Jam County